The Homer Laughlin Building, at 317 South  Broadway in Downtown Los Angeles, is a landmark building best known for its ground floor tenant the Grand Central Market, the city's largest and oldest public market that sees 2 million visitors a year.

History

Built by retired Ohio entrepreneur Homer Laughlin (founder of the Homer Laughlin China Company), the Homer Laughlin Building was the Los Angeles's first fireproofed, steel-reinforced structure.  The original six-story building was designed in 1896 by architect John B. Parkinson. Smith & Carr were the building contractors. In August 1898 Coulter's Dry Goods (later department store) opened here.

In 1905 the structure was expanded through to Hill Street, called either the Laughlin Annex or the Lyon Building.  This design by architect Harrison Albright was the first reinforced concrete building in Los Angeles.  The first post-expansion tenant was the Ville de Paris department store, replaced in 1917 by the Grand Central Market, which still occupies the ground floor of the building. The location was chosen because of its proximity to the Angels Flight Railway allowing for easy access to the well-to-do citizens of Bunker Hill.

In the 1920s the building served as an office for the American architect Frank Lloyd Wright.

The original building was built in the Beaux Arts style, but subsequent modifications drastically changed its appearance including the addition of a tile façade in the 1960s which hid the second-story windows.  Along with the adjacent Million Dollar Theater Building, the Homer Laughlin Building and the Grand Central Market underwent a major renovation in the 1990s under the direction of developer Ira Yellin and architect Brenda Levin.  As part of the rehabilitation residential units were added, creating downtown Los Angeles's first true mixed-use developments in decades.

In 2013, under the leadership of Ira Yellin's widow, Adele Yellin, the Market began welcoming a new wave of vendors who are transforming the nearly century-old food arcade into a major culinary destination.  The ongoing revitalization of the iconic food arcade has garnered numerous media accolades including being named one of the “Hot 10” restaurants nationwide by Bon Appetit magazine in 2014.

References

External links

 Grand Central Market Website
 Grand Central Market Walking Tour
 Public Art @ Grand Central Market
 Grand Central Market US National Archives YouTube Channel

Buildings and structures in Downtown Los Angeles
Laughlin
Food retailers
Laughlin
Landmarks in Los Angeles
Market halls
Laughlin